Taqiabad-e Shahrestan (also Romanized as Taqīābād-e Shahrestān; also known as Taqīābād) is a village in Behnamvasat-e Jonubi Rural District, Javadabad District, Varamin County, Tehran Province, Iran. At the 2006 census, its population was 210, in 49 families.

References 

Populated places in Varamin County